The 2004 Summer Paralympics, the 12th Summer Paralympic Games, were a major international multi-sport event for athletes with disabilities governed by the International Paralympic Committee, held in Athens, Greece from 17 to 28 September 2004. 3,806 athletes from 136 National Paralympic Committees competed. 519 medal events were held in 19 sports.

Four new events were introduced to the Paralympics in Athens; 5-a-side football for the blind, quads wheelchair tennis, and women's competitions in judo and sitting volleyball. Following a scandal at the 2000 Summer Paralympics, in which the Spanish intellectually-disabled basketball team was stripped of their gold medal after it was found that multiple players had not met the eligibility requirements, ID-class events were suspended.

It was also the last time that the old Paralympic symbol was used. The new Paralympic symbol was introduced in 2006.

Host City Bid Process

Athens was chosen as the host city during the 106th IOC Session held in Lausanne, Switzerland on 5 September 1997. The Greek capital had lost its bid to organize the 1996 Summer Olympics to the American city of Atlanta nearly seven years before, during the 96th IOC Session in Tokyo, Japan on 18 September 1990. Under the direction of Gianna Angelopoulos-Daskalaki, Athens pursued another bid, this time for the right to host the Summer Olympics in 2004. The success of Athens in securing the 2004 Games was based largely on the bid's appeal to human values,the history of the Games from the ancient to modern periods and the emphasis that Athens is placed at the pivotal role that Greece and Athens could play in promoting the Modern Olympism and the Olympic Movement. Unlike the 1996 bid committee that was seen arrogant when the city was bidding,the 2004 bid was lauded for its low scale,humility,honest and earnestness, its focused message, and a more real e a detailed bid concept. Unlike,nine years before where concerns and criticisms are raised during the unsuccessful 1996 bid – primarily when was talked in critical subjects about the city's infrastructural readiness, its air pollution, its budget and politicization of the Games events and their preparations. Along a successful organization of another events as the 1991 Mediterranean Games,the 1994 FIVB Volleyball Men's World Championship,1994 World Fencing Championships and the sucesfull 1997 World Championships in Athletics,one month before the Olympic host city election was crucial in allaying lingering fears and concerns among the sporting community and some IOC members about the greek ability to host international sporting events. Another factor that contributed to the Greek capital's selection was a growing sentiment among some IOC members to restore some original values of the Olympics to the Modern Games, a component which they felt was lost during the 1996 Summer Olympics.

New rules applied to the Paralympics 
This was the last edition of the Summer Paralympics in which cities could make the decision whether or not to host the Games. As they were still seen as an optional and second-tier event.The International Olympic Committee (IOC) motivated by all the problems concerning the 1996 Summer Paralympics in Atlanta started a strategic partnership with the International Paralympic Committee (IPC) and demanded from all 11 applicant cities their plans regarding the Paralympics for the first time.All the cities agreed with these requirements.

Medal count

A total of 1567 medals were awarded during the Athens games: 519 gold, 516 silver, and 532 bronze. China topped the medal count with more gold medals, more silver medals, and more medals overall than any other nation. In the table below, the ranking sorts by the number of gold medals earned by a nation (in this context a nation is an entity represented by a National Paralympic Committee).

Among the top individual medal winners was Mayumi Narita of Japan, who took seven golds and one bronze medal in swimming, setting six world records in the process and bringing her overall Paralympic gold medal total to fifteen. Chantal Petitclerc of Canada won five golds and set three world records in wheelchair racing, while Swedish shooter Jonas Jacobsson took four gold medals. France's Béatrice Hess won her nineteenth and twentieth Paralympic gold medals in swimming. Swimmer Trischa Zorn of the United States won just one medal, a bronze, but it was her 55th ever Paralympic medal. She retained her position as the most successful Paralympian of all times.

Opening ceremony 

The opening ceremony for the 2004 Summer Paralympics took place on 17 September 2004. The show started with children passing on knowledge and raising their lights to the sky. This was a reference to Hippocrates, who transferred knowledge to the children. A 26 meters tall olive tree (with more than 195,000 leaves) symbolising life stood in the middle of the arena. The opening ceremony also featured a performance with human drama, with light and with music, in an allegory about obstacles and limits.
The Parade of Delegations was accompanied by the music of French composers Yves Stepping and Jean Christophe. The music told the legend of Hephaestos, god of fire and son of Zeus and Hera. An athlete from Turkmenistan propelled himself around the stadium by doing somersaults. Greece, the home team, received a strong cheer. After that, fireworks erupted at the stadium.
There were 150 local support staff involved and 400 volunteers. The children were from ages 8 to 17, coming from Australia, France, Spain, Greece and Germany.

Philip Craven, the President of the International Paralympic Committee, was accompanied by the head of the organizing committee Gianna Angelopoulos-Daskalaki, who told the athletes and the audience: "The Olympic flame illuminates athletes. Many of you will leave Athens with medals, but all of you will leave as champions." Phil Craven quoted Democritus in his speech: "Two thousand years ago, Democritus said "To win oneself is the first and best of all victories." This holds true for all athletes, but especially for Paralympians. Recognising and cultivating your unique abilities and mastering challenges – you set standards and give expression for many people, young and old, around the world." The Games were officially declared opened by the President of the Hellenic Republic Konstantinos Stephanopoulos in Greek, accompanied by Adjutant Officer of the Hellenic Army Lieutenant Colonel Dimitrios Reskos.

The paralympic flame was lit by Georgios Toptsis, a pioneer athlete in Greece. Toptsis was won three medals (one silver and two bronze) between the 1988 and 1996 Games.

Closing ceremony 
The closing ceremony for the 2004 Summer Paralympics took place on 28 September 2004. The traditional cultural display was removed from the ceremony as a mark of respect for the deaths of seven teenagers from Farkadona, travelling to Athens, whose bus collided with a truck near the town of Kamena Vourla.

"The Athens Olympics Organising Committee [ATHOC] has decided to cancel the closing ceremony of the 12th Athens Paralympics as initially planned and scheduled because of the tragic accident that cost the life of pupils. The artistic and entertainment part of the ceremony will not take place." (official statement)

Flags were flown at half mast and a minute's silence was observed. In contrast with the formal nature of the opening ceremony, the athletes entered the stadium for the final time as a collective. This was followed by official matters, including the handover to Beijing, hosts of the 2008 Summer Paralympics, and a cultural presentation by the delegation (which included a presentation of the new Paralympic "agitos" emblem).  A procession of young people then made their way to join the athletes in the centre of the stadium carrying paper lanterns, before the Paralympic flame was extinguished.

Media coverage controversy
Although the Paralympic Games were broadcast to around 1.6 billion viewers throughout 49 countries, some controversy was caused when no American television network stayed to broadcast the event. This resulted in some US viewers having to wait almost 2 months until the coverage was broadcast, compared with live feeds in several other countries.

Paralympic Media Awards
The BBC won the best broadcaster award.

Sports and impairment groups 

Following a scandal at the 2000 Summer Paralympics, in which the Spanish intellectually-disabled basketball team was stripped of their gold medal after it was found that multiple players had not met the eligibility requirements, ID-class events were suspended, in 2001, the IPC decided to remove events for the intellectually disabled and make several changes to other classifications of different events. In addition, the IPC also expanded the number of events for women in various sports, replacing the standing volleyball tournament with the female sitting volleyball another move was  realization of women's events in judo and the quads events in wheelchair judo. A new team event was also added in the program: 5-a-side football for the blind. In total, 43 events were dropped from the program and 16 were included and 5 were replaced.As a result, 32 fewer finals were held than Sydney, totaling 519 finals.

Results for individual events can be found on the relevant page.

Archery
Athletics
Boccia
see Boccia for general details of the sport
Cycling
Equestrian
Football (5-a-side)
Football (7-a-side)
see Paralympic Football for general details of the sport
Goalball
see Goalball for general details of the sport
Judo
see Paralympic judo for general details of the sport
Powerlifting
see Paralympic powerlifting for general details of the sport
Sailing
see the IPC Sailing microsite for general details of the sport
Shooting
see Paralympic shooting for general details of the sport
Swimming
see Paralympic swimming for general details of the sport
Table Tennis
see Paralympic table tennis for general details of the sport
Volleyball (Sitting)
see Sitting volleyball for general details of the sport
Wheelchair Basketball
see Wheelchair basketball for general details of the sport
Wheelchair Fencing
see Wheelchair fencing for general details of the sport
Wheelchair Rugby
see Wheelchair rugby for general details of the sport
Wheelchair Tennis
see Wheelchair tennis for general details of the sport

Venues 
In total 15 venues were used at the 2004 Summer Olympics.

OAKA
 Indoor Pool of Athens Olympic Aquatic Centre – swimming
 Athens Olympic Tennis Centre – tennis
 Athens Olympic Velodrome – cycling (track)
 Olympic Indoor Hall – Wheelchair basketball 
 Olympic Stadium – ceremonies (opening/ closing), athletics

HOC
 Fencing Hall – Wheelchair Fencing, Volleyball
 Helliniko Indoor Arena – Wheelchair Rugby
 Olympic Baseball Centre – archery
 Olympic Hockey Centre – Football 5-a-side,  Football 7-a-side,

Faliro Coastal Zone Olympic Complex
 Faliro Sports Pavilion Arena – goalball

Markopoulo 
 Markopoulo Olympic Equestrian Centre – equestrian
 Markopoulo Olympic Shooting Centre – shooting

Other Venues 
 Ano Liossia Olympic Hall – boccia, judo
 Panathinaiko Stadium – marathon
 Vouliagmeni Olympic Centre-track cycling
 Agios Kosmas Olympic Sailing Centre – sailing

Participating nations
Athletes from 135 National Paralympic Committees competed in the Athens 2004 Paralympics. 12 National Paralympic Committees made their dèbut at the Paralympic Games:Bangladesh, Botswana, Cape Verde, Central African Republic, Ghana, Guinea, Nepal, Nicaragua, Niger, Suriname, Tajikistan and Uzbekistan competed for the first time.Five National Paralympic Committees that sent delegations to Sydney 2000 did not send delegation to Athens for various reasons and they were: Laos, Madagascar, Mali, Papua New Guinea, and Vanuatu. In Athens there was also no group of independent or neutral athletes.

 
 
 
 
 
 
 
 
 
 
 
 
 
 
 
 
 
 
 
 
 
 
 
 
 
   Chinese Taipei (25)

See also

 Summer Paralympics
 Paralympics
 International Paralympic Committee
 2004 Summer Olympics

References

External links

 25 things you never knew about the Paralympics (BBC website). Also links to information about 20 athletes from Team GB.

 
Sports competitions in Athens
Summer Paralympics
Summer Paralympics
Paralympics
Multi-sport events in Greece
Summer Paralympic Games
2000s in Athens
September 2004 sports events in Europe